Fagurhólsmýri Airport  is an airport serving Fagurhólsmýri, Iceland.

The Ingo VOR-DME (Ident: ING) is located 4.3 nautical miles south of the airport.

See also
Transport in Iceland
List of airports in Iceland

References

 Google Earth

External links
 HERE Maps - Fagurhólsmýri
 OurAirports - Fagurhólsmýri
 Fagurhólsmýri Airport
 OpenStreetMap - Fagurhólsmýri

Airports in Iceland